The Cernița is a small river in the Apuseni Mountains, Alba County, western Romania. It is a left tributary of the river Abrud. It flows through the village Ciuruleasa, and joins the Abrud near the town Abrud. It is fed by several smaller streams, including the Buninginea and the Ciuruleasa.

References

Rivers of Romania
Rivers of Alba County